The University of Kansas Jayhawks football team has had 177 players drafted into the National Football League (NFL). KU has seen nine players taken in the first round, including six top-10 picks: Gale Sayers, John Riggins, Ray Evans, Mike Butler, John Hadl, and David Verser. Sayers, a College and Pro Football Hall of Famer, was the highest pick from KU as the fourth overall pick in the 1965 NFL Draft. Nine different Jayhawks have been drafted in the first round, Aqib Talib, who was drafted with the 20th overall selection in the 2008 NFL draft is the most recent Jayhawk to be drafted in the first round.

Through the annual NFL Draft each NFL franchise gets the chance to add new players to their teams. The current draft rules were established in 2009. The team with the worst record the previous year gets to pick first, then the next-worst team picks second, and so on. Teams that were not in the playoffs receive their draft order by their regular-season record. If 2 or more non-playoff teams have the same record the tie breaker used is their strength of schedule. Playoff teams receive their draft order after all the non-playoff teams, based on their round of elimination (wild card, division, conference, and Super Bowl).

In 1944 the All-America Football Conference was established and it began play in 1946 in direct competition with the NFL. From 1946 to 1949 the two leagues fiercely competed for the top college football prospects with each league holding their own drafts, before the AAFC finally merged with the NFL at the end of the 1949 season.

Like the AAFC earlier, the American Football League (AFL) operated in direct competition with the NFL and held a separate draft. This led to a massive bidding war over top prospects between the two leagues. As part of the merger agreement on June 8, 1966, the two leagues would hold a multiple round "Common Draft". Once the AFL officially merged with the NFL in 1970, the "Common Draft" simply became the NFL Draft.

Sixteen former Jayhawks who were drafted have been selected to a Pro Bowl or AFL All-Star Game. Twelve former Jayhawks who were drafted have won a championship with their respective teams, one was named MVP, John Riggins in Super Bowl XVII.



Key

Selections

Notable undrafted players
Note: No drafts held before 1936

See also

 List of University of Kansas people

Notes

References

Kansas

Kansas Jayhawks NFL Draft